Alex Bueno (born 6 September 1963) is a singer and guitarist from the Dominican Republic, specializing in merengue and bachata music.  He joined Gerardo Vera’s All-Stars in 1979 and formed Orquesta Liberación in 1982. His 1990 hit, Jardin Prohibido is one of his many popular hits throughout Latin America.

References 

21st-century Dominican Republic male singers
People from Santiago Province (Dominican Republic)
Dominican Republic people of Spanish descent
Bachata musicians
Merengue musicians
Living people
1963 births
20th-century Dominican Republic male singers